The Church of St. Nicholas of Tolentine is a Roman Catholic parish church under the authority of the Roman Catholic Archdiocese of New York, located at Fordham Road at University Avenue, in the Bronx borough of New York City, in the U.S. state of New York. The substantial stone twin-towered is deemed "The Cathedral of the Bronx."

History
The parish was founded by the Augustinian friars on 22 April 1906, with the first Mass occurring in a small garage on North Street near Jerome Avenue. Immediately from 1906 on, construction of a permanent church with parochial buildings on Andrews Avenue and Fordham Road commenced. The complex would consist of a two-story "combination building," a parochial school-over-church building, along with a separate rectory. Monsignor J. F. Mooney, V.G. laid the cornerstone on 15 July 1906. the church was dedicated by Archbishop (later Cardinal) Farley on 15 September 1907. In 1914, the property was valued at $135,000. By 1914, the University Avenue and Fordham Road property that the present church stands on was purchased and being prepared. The present Collegiate Gothic church structure was built 1927 to the designs of Delaney, O'Connor & Schultz. The building has been incorrectly dated by other sources to the 1950s and early 1900s.

On March 5, 2010, a suspicious two-alarm blaze filled the sanctuary with flames and smoke. "The fire started in a former confessional-turned-storage room in the vestibule of the church, blocking the main entrance." The Rev. Joseph Girone evacuated worshipers through the rectory after principal exits were blocked. Some firemen were injured from a falling plaster ceiling. FDNY Deputy Chief Kevin Scanlon called the fire "suspicious" that "accelerated rapidly [and] it was a heavy fire that didn't have the normal flow of a fire." A string of arson attacks against Bronx churches had recently claimed the Glory of Christ Church in December 2009 in Parkchester. Despite the fire, church services were resumed at the parish school's gym, adjacent to the church.

The parish is still staffed by the Augustinian friars.

St. Nicholas of Tolentine Elementary School
The parochial school, which opened in 1907, was run by the Augustinian Fathers and the Sisters of Charity. In 1914, the school was run by 2 Sisters of Charity and 1 lay teacher. The school had 45 male and 45 female pupils. The original school was over the church, and took over the whole building when the present church building was completed in 1927. The school has around 376 students from pre-kindergarten to eighth grade. The school closed June 2019.

Former St. Nicholas of Tolentine High School
There was a St. Nicholas of Tolentine High School, which the parish operated from 1927 to 1991.

It was famous for its high school basketball team.

The teaching faculty were a mix of layperson educators, Augustinian priests, and Dominican nuns.

References

External links 
 

Gothic Revival church buildings in New York City
Christian organizations established in 1906
Churches completed in 1907
Roman Catholic churches completed in 1927
Roman Catholic churches in the Bronx
Augustinian churches
Private middle schools in the Bronx
1906 establishments in New York City
University Heights, Bronx
Catholic elementary schools in the Bronx
20th-century Roman Catholic church buildings in the United States